Pacific Ocean Areas was a major Allied military command in the Pacific Ocean theater of World War II. It was one of four major Allied commands during the Pacific War and one of three United States commands in the Asiatic-Pacific Theater. Admiral Chester W. Nimitz of the U.S. Navy, Commander in Chief, U.S. Pacific Fleet, headed the command throughout its existence.

The vast majority of Allied forces in the theatre were from the U.S. Navy, U.S. Army and U.S. Marine Corps. However units and/or personnel from New Zealand, the United Kingdom, Australia, Canada, Mexico, Fiji and other countries also saw active service.

Formation and composition
On 24 March 1942, the newly formed British and U.S. Combined Chiefs of Staff issued a directive designating the Pacific theater an area of American strategic responsibility. On 30 March the U.S. Joint Chiefs of Staff (JCS) divided the Pacific theater into three areas: the Pacific Ocean Areas (POA), the South West Pacific Area (SWPA), and the Southeast Pacific Area (which was never activated). Details and transition, including whether Nimitz "appointed" or "nominated" the commander of the South Pacific Area, were worked out between 3 April and formal assumption of the overall Commander-in-Chief Pacific Ocean Areas by Nimitz on 8 May 1942.

The JCS designated Admiral Nimitz as Commander in Chief, Pacific Ocean Areas, with operational control over all units (air, land, and sea) in that area. The theater included most of the Pacific Ocean and its islands, but mainland Asia was excluded from the POA, as were the Philippines, Australia, the Netherlands East Indies, the Territory of New Guinea (including the Bismarck Archipelago) and the western part of the Solomon Islands. U.S. strategic bomber forces in the theatre were under the direct control of the JCS. All land forces in Alaska and Canada remained under the control of the U.S. Army's Western Defense Command.

The JCS subdivided the Pacific Ocean Areas into the North, Central and South Pacific Areas. Nimitz designated subordinate commanders for the North and South Pacific Areas but retained the Central Pacific Area, including the Army's Hawaiian Department, under his direct command.

General Douglas MacArthur assumed command of the SWPA. The result of this split was the creation of two separate commands in the Pacific: POA and SWPA, each reporting separately to the JCS, each competing for scarce resources in an economy-of-force theater, and each headed by a commander in chief from a different service. In particular, the division of the Solomons caused problems, since the battles of the Solomon Islands campaign in 1942–1943 ranged over the whole region, with the main Japanese bases in SWPA and the main Allied bases in POA. However, MacArthur's Operation Cartwheel, which gave full operational command of naval and amphibious forces to POA's Admiral William Halsey in the Solomons while MacArthur strategically directed the whole operation, was a resounding success because of the rapport and great personal relationship between MacArthur and Halsey. When Halsey operated in the Solomon Islands that was west of 159° east longitude he reported to MacArthur. When he operated east of 159° east longitude he reported to Nimitz. The 159° meridian east runs through the middle of Santa Isabel Island.

Commanders

South Pacific Area 
 Vice Admiral Robert L. Ghormley (19 June–18 October 1942)
 Vice Adm./Adm. William Halsey, Jr. (18 October 1942 – 15 June 1944)
 Vice Adm. John H. Newton (15 June 1944 – 13 March 1945)
 Vice Admiral William L. Calhoun (13 March–2 September 1945)

North Pacific Area 
 Rear Adm. Robert A. Theobald (17 May 1942 – 4 January 1943)
 Rear Adm. Thomas C. Kinkaid (4 January–11 October 1943)
 Vice Adm. Frank J. Fletcher (11 October 1943 – 2 September 1945)

Forces 
During the 1942 Aleutian Islands campaign Rear Admiral Robert A. Theobald commanded Task Force 8 afloat. Theobald as Commander North Pacific Force reported to Nimitz in Hawaii. Task Force 8 consisted of five cruisers, thirteen destroyers, three tankers, six submarines, as well as naval aviation elements of Fleet Air Wing Four.

From 1942-1943, three Army infantry divisions (23rd/"Americal", 25th, 27th) and two Marine divisions (1st, 2nd) fought in the POA (the 1st and 3rd Marine Divisions also fought in the SWPA in 1943).  From 1944-1945, five Army infantry divisions (7th, 27th, 77th, 81st, 96th) and six Marine divisions (1st, 2nd, 3rd, 4th, 5th, 6th) served in the POA. An additional 15 Army divisions fought in the SWPA during this time. Among allied land force formations was the 3rd New Zealand Division, which fought in the Solomon Islands campaign during 1943-44.

U.S. Army Air Forces operated in the POA under the Seventh, Thirteenth, and Twentieth Air Forces at various times. On 10 March 1944, the Department of War approved the activation of an additional AAF headquarters for the Pacific Ocean Areas. To head this new command the Air Staff in Washington DC had decided as early as 16 April upon Lt. Gen. Millard F. Harmon, who, as commander of U.S. Army Forces, South Pacific Area, had had long experience in the Pacific. By May the War Department proposed that Lt. Gen. Robert C. Richardson Jr., commanding U.S. Army Forces Central Pacific Area, be named Commanding General of U.S. Army Forces, Pacific Ocean Areas. Harmon was made responsible to Nimitz for all matters regarding 'plans, operations, training, and dispositions' of his forces. In addition, as deputy commander of the Twentieth Air Force, Harmon was made responsible directly to Arnold in all matters affecting elements of the Twentieth Air Force in POA. 

Activation of Headquarters, Army Air Forces, Pacific Ocean Areas (AAFPOA) at Hickam Field followed on 1 August 1944. The Seventh Air Force, formerly the senior command, was made "mobile and tactichi" on 15 August by the reassignment of 112 units of various types to AAFPOA. The VII Air Force Service Command, its former administrative functions having been assumed by Breene as AAFPOA deputy commander for administration, was transferred to ASC/AAFPOA, where it lost its identity as an operating agency. The Seventh Air Force was left only VII Bomber Command and VII Fighter Command. The other AAFPOA operating forces were XXI Bomber Command and the Hawaiian Air Defense Wing(?) (probable source misprint for 7th Fighter Wing). In preparation for the support of VHB units, the Hawaiian Air Depot was expanded and assigned directly to AAFPOA. For the forward or combat area, plans were laid for a Guam Air Depot (later, Harmon Air Force Base), which was established in November.

Allied air forces included units of the Royal New Zealand Air Force.

See also 
United States Navy in World War II
US Naval Advance Bases

Notes

References

External links 

Strategy and Command: The First Two Years
 The Official Chronology of the U.S. Navy in World War II, Appendix I

Allied commands of World War II
Military units and formations established in 1942
Military units and formations disestablished in the 1940s